Spain competed at the 2002 Winter Olympics in Salt Lake City, United States.

Change By Doping

Alpine skiing

Women

Cross-country skiing

Men
Pursuit

1 Starting delay based on 10 km C. results. 
C = Classical style, F = Freestyle

Snowboarding

Men's halfpipe

References

Links
Official Olympic Reports
 Olympic Winter Games 2002, full results by sports-reference.com

Nations at the 2002 Winter Olympics
2002 Winter Olympics
olympics